Bi-Rite Market is a grocery store in San Francisco, California, owned and operated by chef Sam Mogannam, who had previously worked at Jardinière in the city. He and his brother Raphael Mogannam took over the grocery store from his family in 1997, and began to sell prepared foods using locally grown produce, which they advocate for.

Background
Mogannam spoke at TEDxPresidio 2012 on reinventing capitalism. Fast Company profiled him as one of the 100 most creative people in business for 2012. The market runs a non-profit community food education project, 18 Reasons. The store is a pioneer in the new farm-to-grocery store movement, and has published a book, Eat Good Food (Ten Speed Press). Whole Foods Market has sent staff to the store to adopt practices from there. The store opened a second location, in the Divisadero Street Commercial District, in the Western Addition neighborhood, in 2013.

Bi-Rite earned certification as a B Corporation in late 2015 for its contribution to developing a more sustainable and inclusive economy. In 2018, Bi-Rite was named a Best for Community World Honoree by B-Lab.

References

Further reading

External links

Bi-Rite Market press coverage
Eat Good Food at Random House/Ten Speed Press website
Sam Mogannam, speaker at TEDxPresidio 2012

Companies based in San Francisco
Food and drink in the San Francisco Bay Area
1960s establishments in California
Supermarkets based in California

B Lab-certified corporations